The Chinese Ambassador to Kyrgyzstan is the official representative of the People's Republic of China to the Kyrgyz Republic.

List of representatives

References 

 
Kyrgyzstan
China